Jack Rabbit is a wooden roller coaster located at Kennywood Park near Pittsburgh in West Mifflin, Pennsylvania. Designed and built by John A. Miller and Harry C. Baker, Jack Rabbit opened in 1920, making it one of the oldest roller coasters in the world still in operation. The ride's three trains were manufactured by Edward Vettel, Sr. in 1951 and contain three cars of six seats each.  The aging cars are considered a part of the ride's nostalgic experience but also lead to some young children being disallowed to enter the ride (42” is the minimum), due to the use of a small lap bar to hold in riders.  A popular early feature of the ride was a tunnel which covered the turnaround section after the first drop, but this was removed in 1947 when the new cars were ordered. In 1991, the tunnel was restored, at a slightly shorter length.

The Jack Rabbit was built shortly after Miller patented a new track design in 1920 (which all wooden coasters built since have used). This design involved the use of wheels both under and over the track, which allowed Miller to create the then enormous  drop that is the attraction's largest.  It is most well known for its double dip element following the lift hill. The double dip produces strong airtime that makes the rider feel that they will be thrown from the seat, and a feeling that the train leaves the track (it rises up but the upstop wheels keep it firmly on the rails).

According to Rick Sebak, producer of Pittsburgh history programs for WQED, the layout and train design results in the rear seat of each train experiencing the greatest amount of airtime.

In 2019, Kennywood released a video of the Jack Rabbit, likely from 1920, on their YouTube channel. The video features clips of people on the ride and clips taken from the front row seat of the Jack Rabbit. Kennywood claims their video is "the oldest coaster POV video in the world".

Awards
The nonprofit organization American Coaster Enthusiasts (ACE) designated Jack Rabbit as a Coaster Classic. The ACE also designated Jack Rabbit as an "ACE Roller Coaster Landmark" in June 2010. It is also a contributing structure to the Kennywood Park historic district, listed on the National Register of Historic Places.

Gallery

References 

Kennywood
Roller coasters introduced in 1920